Paul Wehner (7 September 1896 – 1 June 1982) was a German sports shooter. He competed at the 1936 Summer Olympics and 1952 Summer Olympics.

References

1896 births
1982 deaths
German male sport shooters
Olympic shooters of Germany
Shooters at the 1936 Summer Olympics
Shooters at the 1952 Summer Olympics
Place of birth missing